Homosexual teen fiction may refer to:

Gay teen fiction
Lesbian teen fiction